

Used to Be Duke is a studio album by Johnny Hodges, accompanied by members of Duke Ellington's orchestra, released by Norgran Records in October 1956.

Reception

Scott Yanow on AllMusic gave the album four stars out of five, commenting "Hodges had a particularly strong group. High points include 'On the Sunny Side of the Street', the title track and a seven-song ballad medley."

Track listing 
 "Used to Be Duke" (Johnny Hodges) - 7:24
 "On the Sunny Side of the Street" (Dorothy Fields, Jimmy McHugh) - 2:59
 "Sweet as Bear Meat" (Hodges) - 3:22
 "Madam Butterfly" (Jimmy Hamilton, Hodges) - 3:17
 "Warm Valley" (Duke Ellington) - 3:24
 Ballad medley: "Autumn In New York"/"Sweet Lorraine"/"Time On My Hands"/"Smoke Gets in Your Eyes"/"If You Were Mine"/"Poor Butterfly" (Vernon Duke)/(Cliff Burwell, Mitchell Parish)/(Vincent Youmans, Harold Adamson, Mack Gordon)/(Jerome Kern, Otto Harbach)/(Matty Malneck, Johnny Mercer)/(Raymond Hubbell, John Golden) - 17:55

Personnel 
Johnny Hodges - alto saxophone
Shorty Baker - trumpet
Lawrence Brown - trombone
Jimmy Hamilton - clarinet, tenor saxophone (tracks 1, 6)
John Coltrane - tenor saxophone (tracks 1-3)
Harry Carney - baritone saxophone
Call Cobbs Jr. (tracks 1-5), Richie Powell (track 6) - piano
John "Buddy" Williams - double bass
Louie Bellson - drums

References 

1956 albums
Johnny Hodges albums
Albums produced by Norman Granz
Norgran Records albums